Bartolomeo Aimo (sometimes written Bartolomeo Aymo (Virle Piemonte, 24 September 1889 — Turin, 1 December 1970) was an Italian professional road bicycle racer. He finished on the podium of the Giro d'Italia four times (1921, 1922, 1923, 1928) and on the podium of the Tour de France two times (1925, 1926) but never won a grand tour.

Major results

1921
Giro d'Italia:
3rd place overall classification
Tour des Alpes Apuanes
1922
Giro d'Italia:
Winner stages 5 and 9
2nd place overall classification
1923
Giro d'Italia:
Winner stage 2
3rd place overall classification
Giro del Piemonte
1924
Giro d'Italia:
Winner stage 1
Tour de France:
4th place overall classification
1925
Tour de France:
Winner stage 13
3rd place overall classification
1926
Tour de France:
Winner stage 14
3rd place overall classification
1928
Giro d'Italia:
3rd place overall classification

External links 

Official Tour de France results for Bartolomeo Aymo

Italian male cyclists
1889 births
1970 deaths
Italian Tour de France stage winners
Italian Giro d'Italia stage winners
Sportspeople from the Metropolitan City of Turin
Cyclists from Piedmont
20th-century Italian people